Cheryl Chan Wei Ling  (born 1976) is a Singaporean politician and businesswoman. A member of the governing People's Action Party (PAP), she has been the Member of Parliament (MP) representing the Fengshan division of East Coast GRC since 2020 and previously Fengshan SMC between 2015 and 2020.

Education
Chan attended Singapore Chinese Girls' School and Catholic Junior College before graduating from the Nanyang Technological University in 1999 with a Bachelor of Applied Science with honours degree in materials engineering.

She subsequently went on to complete a Master of Business Administration degree at the Macquarie Graduate School of Management in 2004.

Chan was awarded the Nanyang Outstanding Young Alumni Award in 2016.

Career
Chan is currently Head of APAC Clean Hydrogen, Linde plc (Gas & Engineering). She is responsible for identifying market and technology trends in Clean Hydrogen and developing strategies for business growth for APAC.

Prior to joining Linde in 2007, Chan worked at Kulicke & Soffa, a design and manufacturing company for semiconductor, LED and electronic assembly equipment. She spent several years in technical roles and as a process engineering manager before becoming a product marketing manager.

Political career
On 27 August 2015, the People's Action Party (PAP) announced that Chan would contest in the revived Fengshan SMC in the 2015 general election. Chan was elected into Parliament when she defeated Dennis Tan of the Workers' Party and clinched 57.5% of the electorate valid votes.

Leading up to the 2020 general election, the Electoral Boundaries Review Committee updated Singapore's electoral boundaries, in which Fengshan SMC would be absorbed into East Coast GRC. Chan would contest in the 2020 general election under the PAP's ticket in East Coast GRC against the Workers' Party, alongside Heng Swee Keat, Maliki Osman, Jessica Tan, and Tan Kiat How. On 11 July 2020, Chan and the PAP team were declared elected Members of Parliament for East Coast GRC after garnering 53.41% of the valid votes. She was then appointed Chairperson of National Development Government Parliamentary Committee (GPC) in the 14th Parliament.

Awards
2013: As chairperson of Fengshan Community Club Management Committee (CCMC), Chan was awarded the Pingat Bakti Masyarakat (Public Service Medal).
2016: Nanyang Outstanding Young Alumni Award.

References

External links
 Cheryl Chan on Parliament of Singapore

1976 births
Living people
Members of the Parliament of Singapore
Catholic Junior College alumni
Nanyang Technological University alumni
People's Action Party politicians
Singaporean politicians of Chinese descent
Singaporean people of Cantonese descent
Singaporean women in politics